Sequ Sechen Barlas or, Suqu Sechen mean (The Sage) (Mongolian: Суку Сечен Барлас,  living in the 12th and approx. lives 1190s) was a Borjigin Prince and Advisor, military commander of the Khamag Mongol Confederacy, he was serving Ambaghai Khan, Hotula Khan, and the father of Genghis Khan Yesükhei Bagatur at the (1150s1171 AD.) Suqu was the father of Qarachar Barlas (1166 1256) who was the Foundation of Barlas Clan which is sub-branch of borjigin and the paternal ancestor of Timur, and the father of Qubilai Barlas (1150 1211) the one of four hounds of Genghis Khan, as well as the father of Tuqachar Kuregan (d. 1221) who was the ''son-in-law'' and military commander of Genghis Khan. he was the son of Erumduli Barlas who was the Grandson of Tumbinai Khan who was the Khan of Borjigin Mongol.
12th-century Mongolian people
Borjigin

References 

Mongol Empire people